Johan Alfred Salonen (9 March 1884 – 11 January 1939) was a Finnish wrestler. He competed in the lightweight event at the 1912 Summer Olympics.

References

External links
 

1884 births
1939 deaths
Wrestlers at the 1912 Summer Olympics
Finnish male sport wrestlers
People from Heinola
Olympic wrestlers of Finland
Sportspeople from Päijät-Häme
World Wrestling Championships medalists